Commercial National Financial Corporation is a registered financial holding company under the Bank Holding Company Act of 1956 as amended. The company wholly owns Commercial Bank & Trust of PA under the Bank Holding Company Act. The company's principal business is the operation of Commercial Bank & Trust of PA, which offers various commercial banking and trust services including offering deposit services, providing financial counseling, investing and extending credit. Commercial National Financial Corporation uses CNAF as the trading symbol on the OTCQB tier of the OTC Markets.

History
In May 1934, Commercial Bank & Trust of PA was established in the Latrobe office of the former Peoples National Bank. Today, the company still use this building as administrative headquarters and the main retail office.

In 2008, the Corporation entered into a Stock Purchase Agreement with the shareholders of Ridge Properties Inc. to purchase Ridge Properties Inc, which is a Pennsylvania corporation whose asset is Commercial National Financial Corporation stock.

In June, 2012, the Corporation declared that its board of directors approved the voluntary delisting of its common stock from NASDAQ and the deregistration of the company's common stock with the Securities and Exchange Commission (SEC).

References

External links

American companies established in 1934
Banks established in 1934
Holding companies established in 1934
Banks based in Pennsylvania
Companies listed on the Nasdaq
1934 establishments in Pennsylvania